There were fourteen different classes of destroyers that were used by the Soviet Navy in World War II:

 Yakov Sverdlov class Destroyer
 Frunze class Destroyer
 Orfey class Destroyer
 Izijaslav class Destroyer
 Fidonisy class Destroyer
 Leningrad class Destroyer - 6 operational in July 1941
 Tashkent class Destroyer
 Type 7 class Destroyer - 28 operational in July 1941
 Type 7U class Destroyer - 18 operational in July 1941
 Opytny class Destroyer
 Ognevoy class Destroyer
 Town class Destroyer
 Regele Ferdinand class Destroyer

Gallery

References